Aesculus parryi, known as the Parry buckeye or Baja California buckeye, is a species of shrub or small tree in the genus Aesculus. It is native to Mexico, specifically northwest Baja California.

References

Aesculus
Flora of North America